In molecular biology, cob(I)yrinic acid a,c-diamide adenosyltransferase (also known as ATP:cob(I)alamin adenosyltransferase or ATP:corrinoid adenosyltransferase)  is an enzyme which catalyses the conversion of cobalamin (vitamin B12) into one of its coenzyme forms, adenosylcobalamin (coenzyme B12, AdoCbl). Adenosylcobalamin is required as a cofactor for the activity of certain enzymes. AdoCbl contains an adenosyl moiety liganded to the cobalt ion of cobalamin via a covalent Co-C bond.

ATP:cob(I)alamin adenosyltransferases are classed into three groups: CobA-type, EutT-type  and PduO-type. Each of the three enzyme types appears to be specialised for particular AdoCbl-dependent enzymes or for the de novo synthesis of AdoCbl. PduO and EutT are distantly related, sharing short conserved motifs, while CobA is evolutionarily unrelated and is an example of convergent evolution.

The CobA group includes the ATP:cob(I)alamin adenosyltransferases CobA (Salmonella typhimurium), CobO (Pseudomonas denitrificans), and ButR (Escherichia coli). There is a high degree of sequence identity between these proteins. CobA is responsible for attaching the adenosyl moiety from ATP to the cobalt ion of the corrin ring, necessary for the conversion of cobalamin to adenosylcobalamin. PduO functions to convert cobalamin to AdoCbl for 1,2-propanediol degradation, while EutT produces AdoCbl for ethanolamine utilisation.

Synonyms
This enzyme is also known as:
 Cobalamin adenosyltransferase
 ATP:cob(I)alamin adenosyltransferase
 ATP:corrinoid adenosyltransferase

See also
 Cobalamin biosynthesis

References

Protein families
EC 2.5.1